Bernard Chevallier (4 October 1912 – 6 April 1997 was a French equestrian and Olympic champion. He won an individual gold medal in eventing at the 1948 Summer Olympics in London.

References

External links

1912 births
Sportspeople from Chartres
1997 deaths
French male equestrians
Olympic equestrians of France
Equestrians at the 1948 Summer Olympics
Olympic gold medalists for France
Olympic medalists in equestrian
Medalists at the 1948 Summer Olympics